"It Was I" is a 1959 song written by vocalist Gary S. Paxton when he released it as part of a duo with Clyde Battin called Skip & Flip.  "It Was I" reached No. 11  The song was ranked No. 84 on Billboard magazine's Top Hot 100 songs of 1959.

Lindsey Buckingham recording
The song was later covered by American guitarist and vocalist Lindsey Buckingham, and was released as the second single off his debut album, Law and Order. Unlike Buckingham's previous single "Trouble", "It Was I" was not a big hit for Buckingham, failing to match the success of the original. The song only reached No. 10 on the Billboard Bubbling Under chart, an extension to the Hot 100.

"It Was I" fared slightly better in Australia, where it managed to reach the No. 74 spot. Despite only achieving minor success in Australia, "It Was I" performed better there than any of Buckingham's subsequent singles, including "Go Insane", which only reached No. 100.

Personnel
 Lindsey Buckingham – Lead vocals, all instrumentation
Carol Ann Harris – Backing vocals

References

1959 songs
1959 singles
1981 singles
Songs written by Gary S. Paxton
Skip & Flip songs
Lindsey Buckingham songs
Asylum Records singles